Cold Mailman is a Norwegian indie pop band, originally from Bodø, currently based in Oslo. The band was started by Ivar Bowitz (guitar and vocals), but now also consists of Martin Bowitz on bass, Stian Hansen on drums, Torbjørn Hafnor on guitar, Catharina Sletner (on synthesizers and vocals), and Martin Smådal Larsen on guitar. The band members have played in bands like The Spectacle, Beyond The Fences and Lukestar, and both Hafnor and Hansen are playing in the band Kollwitz.

The band released their debut studio album How To Escape Cause And Effect in 2008, followed by Relax; The Mountain Will Come To You in 2010, Heavy Hearts, which was released by Beyond Records (Norway) in 2013, Everything Aflutter in 2015 and Baby Wake up We Are Losing the Fire in 2020.

Both of the band's music videos, "My Recurring Dream" and "Time Is of the Essence", are directed by the Norwegian director André Chocron, and have achieved a lot of views and attention, both from music blogs and video awards. "Time Is of the Essence" was nominated for Spellemannprisen (the Norwegian Grammy) in 2011, and "My Recurring Dream" was nominated for The UK Music Video Awards in 2013.

Discography
Album

Singles

References

External links
Cold Mailmans official web page
Cold Mailman on Facebook
Beyond Records

Musical groups from Bodø
Norwegian indie pop groups